Rose McDowall (née Porter; born 21 October 1959) is a Scottish musician, who formed Strawberry Switchblade with Jill Bryson in 1981.

History
McDowall was born in Glasgow, Scotland in 1959. Her first venture into music was in the Poems, an art-punk trio formed in 1978 with her then-husband Drew McDowall. She then formed Strawberry Switchblade in 1981 with Jill Bryson. After signing with Warner Bros. Records, they enjoyed chart success with their single "Since Yesterday" in 1984; however, later singles and an album did not sell as well as expected. This and internal problems led to an acrimonious split in 1986.

For the next six years, McDowall was primarily a guest vocalist or "floating member" of several different alternative bands, particularly in the neofolk genre. She contributed backing or lead vocals for Coil, Current 93, Death in June, Felt, Alex Fergusson, Into a Circle, Megas, Nature and Organisation, Nurse with Wound, Ornamental, Psychic TV and Boyd Rice on recordings as well as singing or playing guitar for live appearances. In 1993, she collaborated with Boyd Rice under the band name Spell, producing two singles and an album of 1960s-style pop, country and psychedelia covers for Mute Records. 

At the same time, she formed a folk rock band called Sorrow with then-husband Robert Lee. Between 1993 and 2001, they released two albums and one EP through World Serpent Distribution and performed in Europe and the US. During this time, McDowall continued to record and perform with Current 93 and Coil, including the short-lived group Rosa Mundi. Robert Lee left the band in 2002. McDowall and her remaining bandmates continued to perform as Rosa Mundi until 2005 when she began performing under her own name.

McDowall is best known as a vocalist, but also plays guitar, keyboards, melodica, and drums. Her signature instruments are a Washburn 12-string acoustic guitar, a Fender Coronado electric 6-string guitar and an electric harmonium.

She has two daughters and a son: Keri McDowall, from her marriage to Drew McDowall, and Bobi and Velocity Lee, from her marriage to Robert Lee.

Discography

Rose McDowall

Strawberry Switchblade

Spell

Sorrow

Track appears on:
Not Alone

Current 93

See: Current 93

Nature and Organisation

Backworld

References

External links

A 12-page January 2002 interview with Rose McDowall (single screen version)
Rose McDowall on Discogs

1959 births
Living people
Musicians from Glasgow
21st-century Scottish women singers
Scottish new wave musicians
Women new wave singers
Coil (band) members
Current 93 members
20th-century Scottish women singers
Rosa Mundi (group) members